On 24 May 1993, Eritrea gained independence from Ethiopia following a United Nations sponsored referendum, which gained 99.8% Eritrean support for independence. Isaias Afwerki became president and head of Eritrea, after fighting with his Eritrean People's Liberation Front (EPLF) against the authoritarian Derg government during the Ethiopian Civil War from 1974 to 1991. Eritrea became a one-party state and promised to schedule presidential elections in 2001, but was then delayed them indefinitely without precondition. Isaias became a totalitarian leader and was accused by many watchdogs of repression and purges of journalists, dissent and opposition groups like People's Front for Democracy and Justice (PFDJ) officials, mass surveillance, arbitrary detention, lack of independent judiciary body and freedom of association, press and speech. In 2015, the United Nations Commission of Inquiry on Eritrea reported that there were "systemic, widespread and gross human rights violations carried out in a context of total lack of rule of law". The Freedom in the World ranked Eritrea "not free" state as of 2022, with total 3/100 score in both political rights and civil liberties.

History 

The Eritrean War of Independence began in 1962, and Isaias joined the Eritrean Liberation Front (ELF) in 1967, a post held for three years. As a leader of Eritrean rebellion against Ethiopia's annexation of Eritrean coastal region in 1977, Isaias became an icon for resistance. The Ethiopian Civil War began shortly after the beginning of the military junta Derg regime in 1974, and the EPLF actively participated in fighting against the government along with fellow rebel organization, the Tigray People's Liberation Front (TPLF), and together with it formed a coalition named the Ethiopian People's Revolutionary Democratic Front (EPRDF) in 1988. In April 1991, EPLF took Asmara from the Ethiopian force and in May, they drove out the Derg troops in the area. After the Derg overthrown by EPRDF on 28 May, Isaias quickly maintained U.S support for Eritrean independence and in June 1991, his organization announced the desire to hold a United Nations-sponsored referendum.
 
Isaias also pledged Ethiopia to create a transitional government in Eritrea and the believed the stability of Ethiopia would forge a  new nation. Under Isaias leadership, Eritrea was yet integrated to Ethiopia, and announced its independence on 24 May 1993 following April's referendum, which saw 99.8% Eritreans endorsement for independence. Isaias elected as a president of Eritrea in that day by the new national assembly. In February 1994, Isaias renamed his party EPLF to People's Front for Democracy and Justice (PFDJ). Since, then Isaias undertook series economic reforms to the country despite hardships, and he implemented national service program in May 1994, which serves individuals for 18 month terms, focusing on military training for first six months, and creating awareness of a country with expansions of agricultural sector.

In a session of Organization of African Unity (OAU) in June 1993, Isaias made a backlash comment toward the unity for failing to protect Eritrea's interest during the civil war. He gathered delegates to this issue while the OAU promoted about basic worthy goals for the African continent. Isaias maintained stance on the unity by calling "marginalized actors" of world economic and political scene causing "the wrong manuals" for political management, economic development and democratization.

Under his rule, Eritrea became one-party state with himself promised to hold presidential election scheduled in 2001. New constitution unlikely put in delay and Eritrea was characterized democratic backsliding in the period. Human rights groups and opposition groups accused Isaias's government of being repressive to suppress dissent. Soon after the end of Ethio-Eritrean War in 2000, his government began lockdowns against eleven journalists who were suspected of opposing Eritrea's independence, and closed private newspapers. This move could create divisive opposition groups in Eritrea that leads a formation of dozen political group coalition to overthrow Isaias through paramilitary targets in May 2003.  As a result of Isaias rule became more oppressive authoritarian in a compulsory military service for youth, many Eritreans left their country.   

In 2018, the new Ethiopian prime minister Abiy Ahmed concerted an agreement of peace deals with Eritrea, where Isaias signed in 2018 summit in Asmara, to end border stalemate between the two nations after 20 years. In April 2021, the Eritrean National Defense Force engaged a war with the Tigray People's Liberation Front (TPLF) during the Tigray War, aligning with Abiy's government.

Government

According to US State Department's 2019 annual report, "Eritrea became a centralized totalitarian state under President Isaias Afewerki" after a 1997 constitution failed to be implemented. In April 2000 speech at Princeton University, Isaias promised "constitutionality, political pluralism and free and fair elections are naturally the best institutional tools" for achieving economic prosperity, if in presence of political and cultural realities in specific country. As a leader for Eritrea's independence, Isaias had no intention of holding a presidential election, and a parliamentary election scheduled in 2001 was postponed indefinitely. Although police are responsible for upholding internal security and armed forces external, there are witnesses that the armed forces engaging with demobilizing soldiers, or civilian militias, to meet hybrid tasks of both. Civil authorities sometimes involved in security force to commit severe abuse of power. In 2008, the American ambassador to Asmara, Ronald McMullen, leaked assessment that described the president as "paranoid" where he believed both Ethiopia and US were attempting to kill him. In UN meeting regarding the ongoing Russo-Ukrainian War, Eritrea voted 'no' to resolution to condemn the invasion, which surprised those who claimed Eritrea is one of their experts and in prejudice against the US and the West.

Forto incident
On 21 January 2013, approximately 100 unknown soldiers broke into "Forto", the building of information ministry correspondent on the state television, Eri-TV, and surrounded the staff. They forced the station director, Asmelash Abraha, to read a demand to release all prisoners of conscience and jailed political prisoners, and soliciting an implementation of the 1997 constitution. After he read two sentences, the signal went off-air. Isaias safeguards urged to protect him and his palace, and his airport. Shortly in 10 am, Eri-TV returned to broadcast informing the viewers on ongoing snowstorm in Paris. The mutiny subsided after the government willingly negotiated with soldiers and the release of ministry's employee.

Human rights issues

In 2015, the United Nations Commission of Inquiry on Eritrea reported that there were "systemic, widespread and gross human rights violations carried out in a context of a total lack of rule of law". Norwegian academic Kjetil Tronvoll stated that there are concentration camp in Gulang archipelago intended for individuals from opposition groups, labor camps with makeshift facilities, often made from shipping container. Since 2001, the government banned independent newspapers, arrested their journalists that were critical to Isaias, including seven People's Front for Democracy and Justice (PFDJ) officials, known as G-15, who appealed an open election to the government. On other hands, Eritrea was aligned to human rights organizations, like United Nations Special Rapporteur who has applied for visa.

On the whole, the government accused of forced disappearance, torture, and arbitrary detention, arbitrary and unlawful interference with privacy, independence of judiciary body, freedom of speech, expression and association, censorship and criminal libel laws, restrictions over religious freedom, freedom of movement, restrictions over any political participation, human trafficking, criminalization over same-sex activity, forced labor including forced participation over national service program, regularly beyond 18-month legal obligation. In August 2015, the Human Rights Watch (HRW) published a report documenting the use of unlawful force by security authority against prisoners, national service evaders, army deserters as well as asylum seekers without travel document and certain religious groups using torturing and battery. In June 2018, a thirty-year-old man reportedly died as a result of torture and delayed medical treatment. He has been arrested while attending the burial of Hajji Musa Mohammed Nur, the director of an Islamic school, in March 2018. Freedom in the World ranked Eritrea the "not free" on 2022,   scoring 1/40 for political rights and 2/60 for civil liberties, totalling 3/100.

Foreign relations

Ethiopia

During the Ethiopian Civil War, the Tigray People's Liberation Front (TPLF) initially viewed Eritreans great inspirations and received assistance for their independence. By 1980s and 1990s, the TPLF almost emerged as powerful rebel groups that grew in military skills and implementation of distinctive policies and conception in revolutionary struggle. Varied stance alienated both groups and eventually broke up in 1985.  

Eritrea has engaged border conflicts in since its independence, notably the Badme War, which was opened after Eritrea invasion of Ethiopia in a disputed border of Badme on 6 May 1998, resulting in ten thousands death within two years.  On 12 December 2000, Eritrea signed Algiers Agreement to end the war, but the two countries remained in stalemate in what described as "war footing". and "no-war-no-peace" with absence of foreign and domestic policy domination. Eritrea have security concerns on Ethiopia, particularly supporting Eritrean opposition groups, albeit they are weak and fractured. On other hands, Isaias tactically use the disputed border to keep war footing and justify indefinite mass mobilisation and repression. Eritrea also supported the Ethiopian rebel groups, such as the Oromo Liberation Front (OLF) and the Ogaden National Liberation Front (ONLF) in order to undermine Ethiopian influence over the region. In Somalia, Eritrea has trained, armed and financed militias opposed to the government of Ethiopia during the transitional government. The UN Monitoring Group on Somalia reported an embargo against Eritrea, along with Ethiopia and other states, on Somalia.

In late 2008, their relationship deemed strained and the Ethiopian Border Commission (EEBC) without delimitation of the border in November 2007; the United Nations Missions in Ethiopia and Eritrea (UNMEE) terminated its mandate in 2008, and Eritrean troops ephemerally occupied the Temporary Security Zone. Ethiopia remained in control of EEBC's demarcation border in the side of Eritrea's border, and reached to the most important border, Badme, causing mass mobilisation and high concentration of the both troops in the area.

Eritrea's unchanged stance would reinforce EEBC'S decision backing by international law while Ethiopia remained in adherence of de facto by virtue, and with strong relations to the UN. The 20-years stalemate was ended after Ethiopian Prime Minister Abiy Ahmed came to power in 2018, who signed a "joint declaration of peace and friendship" bilateral summit on 9 July, restoring discontinued diplomatic and trade ties with Eritrea. It includes reopening of Burre to access the landlocked Ethiopia Port of Eritrea and furtherly Zalambessa also opened to allow trade route, and access to Ethio telecom and the Ethiopian Airlines. On 16 September, President Abiy signed another peace treaty with Isaias in Jeddah, Saudi Arabia. According to the Saudi Foreign Minister Adel al-Jubeir on Twitter, the agreement "will contribute to strengthening security and stability in the region at large".

Sudan

Relations with Sudan are generally favorable with mutual support of opposition groups and normalized in 2006.  During the Ethiopian Civil War, Sudan hosted both ELF and EPLF and sent official representatives to liberated Eritrea until December 1991. In 1989, former Sudanese President Omar al-Bashir seized power with the help of National Islamic Front (NIF) led by Hassan Al-Turabi, which opposed the EPLF and Eritrean military force in favor of Eritrean Islamic Jihad Movement (EIJM) to cement Islamic government in the Horn of Africa. In August 1994, the two country signed non-interference treaty, but soon accusations comes from Eritrea, claiming Sudan allowed EIJM fighters camouflaging Eritrean refugees.  From December 1994, Sudan–Eritrea relations deteriorated; the PFDJ hosted conference of Sudanese opposition forces in Asmara in June 1995, to revive the suspended Sudanese National Democratic Alliance (NDA), a coalition party adverse to president al-Bashir, and launch armed struggle against NIF-controlled Sudanese government. The NDA hosted former Sudanese embassy in Asmara and set up its military camps in western Eritrea. In January 1997, NDA opened new front in Eritrea–Sudan border, where Eritrea accused Sudan of assassination plot against Isais in June.

By late 1999, through mediation process by Qatar, the two relations subsided despite not long as the Ethio-Eritrean War. The war would spill overs when Ethiopian troops used Sudanese territory and airspace to fight Eritrea. In response, Eritrea revived support for NDA in order to aid rebel forces in Darfur and to the Sudan Government Liberation Movement (SPLM) in southern Sudan. Finally in January 2005, the Comprehensive Peace Agreement between the Sudanese government and SPLM helped Eritrea to mediate, and facilitated the two country relations. From a background, the two relations remained tense, accusing each other's counterpart backing armed forces: Khartoum accused Asmara for support of rebel groups in southern, eastern and western Sudan, whereas Asmara accused Khartoum for supporting the far-right  Eritrean Islamic Salvation Movement (Eritrean Islamic Jihad) in attacks of Western Eritrea. The Eritrean government believed that EIJ was supported by National Islamic Front in Khartoum, and by Eritrean support for the Sudanese opposition coalition, the National Democratic Alliance. Since 2006, their relations has steadily shown improved within past few years; even creating closer relations between Isaias and al-Bashir. President al-Bashir visited Eritrea for the first time in March 2009, and Isaias visited Sudan in October 2011.

After that month, al-Bashir announced an end of border tensio during inauguration of road connecting the two countries. In June 2013, Isaias announced free-trade zone partnership with Sudan and an extension of highway along with Port Sudan and electricity provision from Sudan to the towns in western Eritrea.

On 10 May 2014, Sudan's state-owned news agency Sudan News Agency announced during Isaias visit to Al Jeili oil refinery that Sudan agreement to supply Eritrea with fuel  and boosting economic partnership. In addition to that, it was reported that Sudanese Electricity Company planned to supply 45 km power line  that stretches from Kassala to Eritrean town Teseney. On 4 May 2021, Isaias visited Khartoum for discussion over the ongoing border dispute between Ethiopia and Sudan. On conversation with Head of Sudan's Sovereign Council Gen. Abdel-Fattah al-Burhan, they raised regional issues and the long-time dispute of the Grand Ethiopian Renaissance Dam.

Djibouti

The relations between Eritrea and Djibouti trace back to 1991. In April 1996, both countries waged war when Djibouti claimed Eritrea had shelled Ras Doumeira, a small village bounded by the Afar Region of Ethiopia. Another accusation, that Eritrea aimlessly redrawn the area in the map incorporating within its territory, which is defined by unilateral decision. Eritrea denied the territorial claims and accusations. The conflict further worsened by May 1996 when Eritrean forces retreated from the area and Djibouti retracted the allegations. The Ethio-Eritrean War opened dilemmatic scenario for Djibouti, constituting both a threat and an opportunity. Since then,  Ethiopia immediately diverted to Djibouti through the use of trade via Eritrean ports, greatly benefited economic ties in accordance with the 1996 protocol. In 1999, Djibouti and Ethiopia signed a military cooperation protocol in which the raise of President Ismaïl Omar Guelleh strengthened these ties.

In 1998, Eritrea accused Djibouti of accessing the port to Ethiopia to supply military equipments in the war. In June 1998, Djibouti deployed military force in the northern area to avoid any incursion during the war. Some French troops were officially involved with Djiboutian troops there. In 1999, France sent two frigates to patrol any incursion toward Ethiopia and Eritrea. Djiboutian President Hassan Gouled Aptidon’s attempt to mediate the Ethio-Eritrean War in June 1998, however, during the Organization of African Unity (OAU) summit in November 1998, rejected by Eritrea for not sufficiently being independent. At the time, Djibouti worsened its relations with Eritrea by expelling its ambassadors. Tekest Ghebrai, an Eritrean national and the former executive secretary of the Intergovernmental Authority on Development (IGAD) was dismissed to Djibouti.

The December 1997 treaty deemed too faint to strengthen their relations and to increase contract for five years. Accusation resurfaced in 1999 when Eritrea accused Djibouti of siding with Ethiopia, and Djibouti alleged Eritrea's support of Djiboutian rebel groups and intensifying Ras Doumeira area, which Eritrea denied. Rapprochement between the two countries returned in March 2000 following mediation by Libya. In 2001, President Isaias visited Djibouti and President Guelleh made vice versa visit. This visit created a joint cooperative commission that would hold annual review. President Guelleh sought friendly relationship with Eritrea, if not neutral, recognizing power imbalance, especially military imbalance prevailed to these nations.

On 22 April 2008, President Guelleh visited the disputed area, and the Djiboutian Foreign Ministry claimed that Eritrean position lying several kilometers in the Djiboutian territory. Eritrea subsequently denied the accusation of its soldiers had dug treaches, and on 24 April 2008, military officials met to compare the border map. Djibouti had little choice to defend instead, sending troops to the area. On 9 May 2008, President Guelleh warned that the "two armies are facing each other", and the situation was. more explosive. He also stated that there were hostile force to dismantle Djiboutian sovereignty. With Qatari mediation, there are some reports of the two diplomatic activity. On 23 April 2008, the two counterparts reported to have met to discuss the skirmish  and agreed to resolve the confrontation in peaceful negotiation.

Somalia
In July 2018, Eritrea and Somalia opened diplomatic relations for the first time. On 28 July 2018, Somalian president Mohamed Abdullahi Mohamed "Farmaajo" met with President Isaias in Asmara that took three day official visit. On the visit, Somalia expressed solidarity to Eritrea in diplomatic and political agenda in the international politics.

Economy

According to the World Bank, Eritrea's recent growth has been affiliated by rain-fed agriculture sector, accounting for one-third of the economy, and 20% of growth domestic product (GDP), and narrow mining sector accounting 20%. Real GDP growth has been recovered by 12% in 2018, while accounting -2.7% during drought and scarcity of mining production in 2015–2018 years. During 2016–2018, real inflation was negative following exchange of currency resulted monetary contraction. Deflation continued in 2018 after reopening economic and trade ties with Ethiopia.

On 18 May 2012, Isaias told in an interview with VOA that the country's development driver over two decades of independence "a success story". Its economic freedom was ranked 171st in 2022, scoring 39.7%, placing 44th among 47 countries in the Sub-Saharan African region, and below in regional and world average. Eritrea's economy grew in 2017 and 2018, and slowed in 2019, turned negative in 2020, and recovered in 2021. With poor scores of business freedom and rule of law, Eritrea suffered from deficient of economic freedom coupled with world's lowest investment freedom score of 2.5 point of overall loss of economic freedom since 2017. Eritrea regulates tax burden with government spending and trade freedom strength albeit judicial and financial freedom are the worst in the world. As a result of regional insecurity deficient in 1998, Eritrea has strong tie with fiscal policy, widening 11% of GDP in 2018. This is caused by drastic sharp drop of capital spending as well as some measures in revenue. However, fiscal pressure, both recurrent and wage, are related likely to mount.

References

History of Eritrea
Human rights in Eritrea